Tiny Tiny RSS is a free RSS feed reader. It is a web application which must be installed on a web server.

Following Google's announcement that they would be retiring Google Reader, Tiny Tiny RSS was widely reviewed as a possible replacement for it in major tech blogs and online magazines.  Reviewers praised its versatility but criticized its performance and installation process.

See also
 Comparison of feed aggregators

References

External links
 

News aggregator software